Where Is Winky's Horse? is a 2007 Dutch children's film. It is the sequel of Winky's Horse. The film received the Golden Film after it had sold 100,000 cinema tickets.

Plot 
A girl who is crazy about horses has the chance of a lifetime to take care of the famous Amerigo, Sinterklaas's horse. She finally has a chance to ride on an actual horse on her birthday, but tragedy strikes and the horse goes missing.

External links
Waar is het Paard van Sinterklaas? (official website) 

2007 films
2000s Dutch-language films
Dutch children's films
Films set in the Netherlands
Films shot in the Netherlands
Sinterklaas films
Films about horses